(1201–1290) was a Japanese Buddhist monk who founded the Shingon Risshu sect.

Eison entered religious training when he was eleven years old, studying initially at Daigo-ji and later at Kongōbu-ji. At the age of 34, while at Saidai-ji, he made the decision to become a fully ordained monk. However, since the process of ordination in Shingon Buddhism had been lost by this point in time, Eison decided to self-ordain, and along with three companions performed his own ordination ceremony at Tōdai-ji in 1236.

After spending some years as a travelling priest, Eison returned to Saidai-ji and founded the Shingon Risshu sect. Saidai-ji prospered under his governance, receiving increased donations and revenue despite Eison's vows of poverty. In later years, Eison also accepted donations of land from the Retired Emperor Kameyama. These generous donations may have been the result of Eison's response to the Mongol invasions of Japan, in which he performed esoteric rituals to repel the invaders. In honour of this, his disciples commissioned one of the earliest examples of a juzo (portrait of a living monk), sculpted in wood.

In 1273, 1275 and 1280, despite his advancing years, Eison made pilgrimages to the Ise Grand Shrine, where he presented copies of the Daihannya-kyo Sutra. After his death in 1290 he was given the posthumous title Kosho Bosatsu (興正菩薩).

Eison is known as the founder of the Ōchamori tea rite, an unusual variation of the Japanese tea ceremony that uses over-sized tea utensils. The story goes that in the year 1281, Eison received an imperial order to conduct prayer rites for Japan's protection against the second attempted Mongolian invasion. Eison responded with rituals inciting Aizen Myōō to intervene and disperse the Mongolian invaders to foreign lands. By good fortune, the invading ships capsized and Japan avoided calamity. 
Following this event, on the final and sixteenth day of the New Year's Mishihō ritual for the protection of emperor and state, Eison proceeded to the Hachiman Shrine on the grounds of Saidai-ji to perform a Hōsan rite of thanks for having been protected from potential harm. Just as Eison concluded the ritual, powdery white snow fell from the sky, transforming the scene into one of breathtaking beauty. Seen as an omen, Eison made a tea offering at the front of the shrine as a display of reverence. After the tea was dedicated to the deity, it was offered to the crowd gathered before the shrine. Due to the large numbers, Eison used a huge tea bowl to distribute the tea to all present. This is the origin of Saidai-ji's Ōchamori tea rite.

See also

 List of National Treasures of Japan (sculptures)
 Byakugō-ji
 Hannya-ji

References

Bibliography

Meeks, Lori (2009), Vows for the Masses: Eison and the Popular Expansion of Precept-Conferral Ceremonies in Premodern Japan, Numen 56 (1), 1-43

Japanese Buddhist clergy
1201 births
1290 deaths
Kamakura period Buddhist clergy